Talk Talk were an English music group of the 1980s.

TalkTalk or Talk Talk may also refer to:

Business
TalkTalk Group, a British telecommunications company and its subsidiaries:
TalkTalk Business
TalkTalk Technology
TalkTalk TV
 TalkTalk Mobile, a telecommunications company in Portugal

Music
 "Talk Talk", a 1965 song by James Carr
"Talk Talk" (The Music Machine song), a 1966 song by The Music Machine
"Talk Talk" (Talk Talk song), a 1982 song by the band of the same name
"Talk Talk", a 1985 song by The Arrows (Canadian band)
"Talk Talk", a 1998 song by Nazareth from the album Boogaloo
"Talk Talk", a 2013 song by Girls' Generation
"TalkTalk" (A Perfect Circle song), a 2018 song by A Perfect Circle

Other
Talk Talk (novel), a 2006 novel by T.C. Boyle

See also
 Talk (disambiguation)
 Talk Talk Talk (disambiguation)
 Talk:Talk